West Royalty-Springvale was a provincial electoral district for the Legislative Assembly of Prince Edward Island, Canada. It was previously known as Winsloe-West Royalty. It was abolished prior to the 2019 election into Charlottetown-Winsloe, Charlottetown-West Royalty, Brackley-Hunter River and New Haven-Rocky Point.

Members
The riding has elected the following Members of the Legislative Assembly:

Election results

West Royalty-Springvale, 2007–2019

2016 electoral reform plebiscite results

Winsloe-West Royalty, 1996–2007

References

 West Royalty-Springvale information

Former provincial electoral districts of Prince Edward Island